The 1929 Vanderbilt Commodores football team represented Vanderbilt University in the 1929 college football season. The 1929 season was Dan McGugin's 25th year as head coach.

Schedule

References

Vanderbilt
Vanderbilt Commodores football seasons
Vanderbilt Commodores football